C.D. Real Mallorca is a Honduran soccer club based in La Ceiba, Honduras.

The club currently plays in Liga Mayor de Futbol de Honduras, Atlántida, Liga Mayor José Trinidad Cabañas.

See also
 Season 09/10

Football clubs in Honduras